Fructosamine-3-kinase is an enzyme that in humans is encoded by the FN3K gene.

Function

FN3K catalyzes phosphorylation of fructosamines formed by glycation, the nonenzymatic reaction of glucose with primary amines followed by Amadori rearrangement. Phosphorylation of fructosamines may initiate metabolism of the modified amine and result in deglycation of glycated proteins.

FN3K is responsible for the formation of fructose 3-phosphate (F3P), a compound identified in the lenses of diabetic rats. The spontaneous decomposition of F3P leads to the formation of 3-deoxyglucosone (3DG). 3DG contributes to diabetic complications. Treatment of normal and diabetic rats with an inhibitor of FN3K demonstrated a large reduction (~50%) in systemic 3DG in both groups. Removal of 3DG at its source by inhibition of FN3K is a viable option to treat diabetes related diseases since it would require a much smaller dose of drug.

References

Further reading

See also
 Protein-fructosamine 3-kinase

EC 2.7.1